Singwango Secondary School is located in Filabusi, Matabeleland South Province, Zimbabwe.  It had a sister school in Carle Place, New York, United States, although Carle Place High School still donates sports equipment and clothes.

References

Educational institutions with year of establishment missing
Buildings and structures in Matabeleland South Province
Schools in Zimbabwe
Education in Matabeleland South Province